Rosa 'American Beauty' is a deep pink to crimson rose cultivar, bred by Henri Lédéchaux in France in 1875, and was originally named Madame Ferdinand Jamin.

Description 
The hybrid perpetual has cup-shaped flowers with a brilliant crimson colour and up to 50 petals, situated on long stiff stems. The buds are thick and globular and open to strongly scented, hybrid tea-like flowers with a diameter of 11 cm. They appear in flushes over a long period, but according to the RHS Encyclopedia of Roses, only sparingly.

'American Beauty' has prickly shoots, dark green foliage and is winter hardy up to −29 °C (USDA zone 5), but is susceptible to the fungi diseases mildew, rust and black spot. It is well suited as cut flower, and can be grown in greenhouses, in containers or as garden rose, planted solitary or in groups.

History 
In 1875 it was brought to the United States by George Valentine Nash. It was introduced as a new rose cultivar named 'American Beauty' by Bancroft and Field Bros in 1886, but quite soon identified as 'Madame Ferdinand Jamin'. In 1888, Bassett & Washburn first introduced the rose to other florists for purchase. It became a famous greenhouse variety and was the best selling rose cultivar in the United States until the 1920s. Due to its high price per stem (at least two dollars per stem right from its launch in 1886) and its popularity, the cultivar was called the million-dollar rose. Its popularity remained focused on the United States, while it is only rarely cultivated in other countries.

Symbol 

The flower is commemorated in the Joseph Lamb ragtime composition "American Beauty Rag".

In a pastiche Ziegfeld-style number, "The Flower Garden Of My Heart" in the 1940 Rodgers & Hart Broadway musical Pal Joey, one of the six 'flower' girls appears as the American Beauty Rose.

The song "American Beauty Rose" was written in 1950 and popularized by Frank Sinatra.

In Joseph Heller's novel Catch-22 an aged Italian hurls an American Beauty rose at Major de Coverly, wounding him in the eye.

The flower is a recurring motif in the Oscar-winning 1999 film American Beauty.

It was also featured on the cover of the Grateful Dead album American Beauty.

'American Beauty' is the official flower of the District of Columbia. It was further adopted as the formal symbol  of the upscale Lord & Taylor store chain in 1943, and as the official flower of several fraternities and sororities (Sigma Phi Delta fraternity, Mu Beta Psi fraternity, Phi Sigma Sigma sorority, Tau Beta Sigma sorority, Beta Beta Beta, a coed academic fraternity for biology majors, and Alpha Rho Omega sorority).

References 

American Beauty
1875 introductions
Symbols of the District of Columbia